Christopher Gascoyne (born 31 January 1968) is an English actor, who is known for being the seventh actor to play Peter Barlow in the soap opera Coronation Street. Gascoyne has been nominated for several accolades at the British Soap Awards for his portrayal of Peter Barlow.

Early life
Gascoyne was born on 31 January 1968 in Huthwaite, Nottinghamshire to Marian and Derrick Gascoyne.
He attended Ashfield School, Kirkby in Ashfield. Gascoyne trained at the Central School of Speech and Drama.

Career
One of his earliest roles was as Judd on Central TV's children's program Murphy's Mob. Gascoyne has acted in numerous television dramas, including the Central Television series for schools Starting Out, released in 1988. He has also had roles in Between the Lines and made an appearance in Murdoch Mysteries as David Jennings. An appearance in Casualty is also another one of Gascoyne's credits. Other appearances include his portrayal of Barry Kent in The Secret Diary of Adrian Mole and as Fusilier Tony Rossi in Soldier Soldier.

Gascoyne was cast in the role of Peter Barlow, the seventh actor to portray the role, in Coronation Street. His original spell occurred between 2000 and 2003, before making a brief return in 2007. During his absence after leaving in 2003, Gascoyne joined the cast of BBC drama New Street Law as Al Ware in 2006. He returned the following year on a permanent basis, making his on-screen return on 30 October 2008. Gascoyne took a four-month break in July 2012, before leaving at the end of his contract in November 2014. He returned briefly in 2015 following the death of his co-star Anne Kirkbride, with Gascoyne stating, "Coming back was like a healing process, we laughed a lot". He returned once again on a permanent basis in October 2016.

Personal life
Gascoyne lives in Chorlton, Manchester with his wife, actress Caroline Harding. They have three children.

In 2008, Gascoyne lost his driving licence for 12 months and was fined £500 after he was stopped by traffic officers and was found to be over the legal drink drive limit. In May 2010, Gascoyne ran in the Great Manchester Run for the Alzheimer's Society, as his grandmother had suffered from the condition.

On occasions when his work on Coronation Street becomes emotionally stressful, Gascoyne practises Buddhism.

Filmography

Film

Television

Awards and nominations

References

External links

1968 births
Living people
People from Huthwaite
Alumni of the Royal Central School of Speech and Drama
English male soap opera actors
English Buddhists
People from Chorlton-cum-Hardy